"What Is Life Without Love" is a 1947 song by Eddy Arnold. The song was Arnold's first number one on the country chart in the US, spending one week at the top and a total of twenty-two weeks on the chart.

References
 

1947 songs
Eddy Arnold songs
Song articles with missing songwriters